Mod, MOD or mods may refer to:

Places
 Modesto City–County Airport, Stanislaus County, California, US

Arts, entertainment, and media

Music
 Mods (band), a Norwegian rock band
 M.O.D. (Method of Destruction), a band from New York City, US
 The Mods (band), a punk rock band from Toronto, Canada

Other uses in arts, entertainment, and media
 Manufactured on demand for CD, DVD distribution
 Mod (film), 2011
 The Mods (film), 2014
 Mod (video games), unofficial modifications
 , a Scottish Gaelic festival
 Media-on-demand
 MuchOnDemand, a Canadian TV program

Brands and enterprises
 Mod Club Theatre, Toronto, Canada
 MOD Pizza, US

Organizations
 MoD (UK), Ministry of Defence
 Masters of Deception, a US hacker group
 Ministry of defence
 Ministry of Development (Brunei)

Science and technology

Computing and Internet
 Mod, a module for Apache HTTP Server
 Case modding of a computer
 Forum moderator, of an online forum
 Module file, a music file format
 MOD (file format), the first module file format
 Modula-2 source code file extension
 Video game modding, a modification of a computer game

Mathematics
 Mod n cryptanalysis, a partitioning attack applicable to block and stream ciphers
 Modulo (mathematics)
 Modular arithmetic
 Modulo operation
 Modular exponentiation

Other uses in science and technology
 MOD., a science museum at the University of South Australia, Adelaide
 MOD and TOD, camcorder recording formats

 Modchip, a chip modifying an electronic system
 Model organism database, a biological database
 Multiple organ dysfunction syndrome, a medical condition

 Pod mods, a type of electronic cigarette

Other uses
 Mod (subculture), 1960s British youth subculture
 Mod revival, late 1970s
 Honour Moderations, Oxford exams
 Maximum operating depth in scuba diving
 Mod Cup, a shinty trophy
 A module in modular scheduling
 Multicultural organization development

See also

 Mode (disambiguation)
 Modification (disambiguation)
 MODS (disambiguation)
 Module (disambiguation)